Lion was one of six s (contre-torpilleurs) built for the French Navy during the 1920s.

After France surrendered to Germany in June 1940 during World War II, Lion served with the navy of Vichy France. She was among the ships of the French fleet scuttled at Toulon, France, on 27 November 1942. She later was salvaged and repaired by the Regia Marina (Italian Royal Navy).

Notes

References

 
 

World War II warships scuttled at Toulon
Guépard-class destroyers
1929 ships
Ships built in France
Maritime incidents in November 1942